Mamda is a Mandal in Nirmal district in the state of Telangana in India. It is one of the largest villages in the district. It has deccan grameena bank and it is situated on the banks of village lake. The village climate will be cool and pleasant due to near by mountains full of trees. Mamdahas famous hanuman temple and newly constructed Sri Venkateshvara temple which lord's idol inaugurated by our honourable minister shri Allola Indrakaran Reddy. It is 19 km from Nirmal.

Demographics

According to Indian census, 2001, the demographic details of Mamda mandal is as follows:
 Total Population: 	28,921	in 6,185 Households. 	
 Male Population: 	14,059	and Female Population: 	14,862		
 Children Under 6-years of age: 4,448 (Boys -	2,251	and Girls - 2,197)
 Total Literates: 	9,655

Villages
The villages in Mamda mandal include: Ananthpet, Rayadhari, Dimmadurthy, 	Gayadpalle, Kamalkot, Kishanraopet, Koratikal, Mamda, Naldurthy,
New Sangvi, Parimandal, Ponkal, Potharam and Tandra.

References 

Villages in Adilabad district
Mandal headquarters in Adilabad district